In computer science and artificial intelligence, ontology languages are formal languages used to construct ontologies. They allow the encoding of knowledge about specific domains and often include reasoning rules that support the processing of that knowledge. Ontology languages are usually declarative languages, are almost always generalizations of frame languages, and are commonly based on either first-order logic or on description logic.

Classification of ontology languages

Classification by syntax

Traditional syntax ontology languages

 Common Logic - and its dialects
 CycL
 DOGMA (Developing Ontology-Grounded Methods and Applications)
 F-Logic (Frame Logic)
 FO-dot (First-order logic extended with types, arithmetic, aggregates and inductive definitions)
 KIF (Knowledge Interchange Format)
 Ontolingua based on KIF
 KL-ONE
 KM programming language
 LOOM (ontology)
 OCML (Operational Conceptual Modelling Language)
 OKBC (Open Knowledge Base Connectivity)
 PLIB (Parts LIBrary)
 RACER

Markup ontology languages
These languages use a markup scheme to encode knowledge, most commonly with XML.

 DAML+OIL
 Ontology Inference Layer (OIL)
 Web Ontology Language (OWL)
 Resource Description Framework (RDF)
 RDF Schema (RDFS)
 SHOE

Controlled natural languages 
 Attempto Controlled English

Open vocabulary natural languages 
 Executable English

Classification by structure (logic type)

Frame-based
Three languages are completely or partially frame-based languages.

 F-Logic
 OKBC
 KM

Description logic-based
Description logic provides an extension of frame languages, without going so far as to take the leap to first-order logic and support for arbitrary predicates.

 KL-ONE
 RACER
 OWL.

Gellish is an example of a combined ontology language and ontology that is description logic based. It distinguishes between the semantic differences among others of:
 relation types for relations between concepts (classes)
 relation types for relations between individuals
 relation types for relations between individuals and classes
It also contains constructs to express queries and communicative intent.

First-order logic-based
Several ontology languages support expressions in first-order logic and allow general predicates.

 Common Logic
 CycL
 FO-dot (First-order logic extended with types, arithmetic, aggregates and inductive definitions)
 KIF

See also
 Domain theory
 Formal concept analysis
 Galois connection
 Lattice (order)
 List of knowledge representation languages
 Modeling language
 OntoUML

Notes

References
 Oscar Corcho, Asuncion Gomez-Perez, A Roadmap to Ontology Specification Languages (2000)
 Introduction to Description Logics – DL course by Enrico Franconi, Faculty of Computer Science, Free University of Bolzano, Italy

 
Modeling languages